South Africa is the most economically unequal country in the world, according to the World Bank. The difference between wealthy and poor in South Africa has been increasing steadily since the end of apartheid in 1994, and this inequality is closely linked to racial divisions in society.

Background 
South Africa's Gini coefficient has remained high since 1982, and has proven to be noticeably higher than countries with similar characteristics. For example, South Africa has a Gini coefficient of 63 (highest), the United States is at 41.5 and Ukraine stands with a score of 25 (lowest). Although Brazil and South Africa are often placed in the same category in terms of wealth and income inequality, Brazil has seen more positive results in recent years. In Brazil's case, its Gini coefficient decreased from 59.3 in 2001 to 53.1 in 2011; this is double the rate of South Africa.

The top 20% of the population in most countries holds a median of 47% of the income, whereas in South Africa the top 20% of the population holds near 70% of the income. The remainder is mostly made up of the middle class, and collectively both the top 20% and the middle class leave less than 5% of the income for the bottom 20% of the population.

South African Economics

Dualism 
South Africa governs a dual economy. One part of the country is structured around an advanced capitalist economy. The other "dual", or divided aspect of the country regards the structure consistent with a third world, and underdeveloped country mostly pertaining to the black population. In South Africa, this idea is known as the first (capitalist, high profit industries) and second (underdeveloped) economies. The first economy contributes to the majority of South Africa's wealth, and is integrated within the global economy. The second economy consists of the low skilled, and outdated jobs. There is little connection between these two economies, as is compliant with the most simple form of the dual economy definition, which is to be divided. This disconnection refers to an economic division, and also contributes to a social division. The second economy does not contribute to economics on a global scale, and serves a purpose to offer growingly low paying jobs.

Current Economic Status 
Historically, South Africa has relied heavily on its mining and agricultural industries, but globalization has altered this. Now the mining and agriculture industries have been labeled as part of the second economy of South Africa. The mining and agriculture industries have been left behind with the modern wave of advanced technology, global trade, and the financial sector of South Africa. As the capitalist financial sector in South Africa has established an important role on a global scale, it has grown since apartheid, while the second economy industries have fallen, along with much of the black population that made up the declining industries. According to the Department of Statistics of South Africa (Stats SA), the unemployment rate stood at 29.1% in the 2019 survey. Between quarter 2 and quarter 3 in 2019, the number of unemployed persons increased as both the agriculture and mining industries each reported 38,000 unemployed. As the number of unemployed persons has increased over the course of time (expected to be higher after the analysis of COVID-19's effect) in the second economy industries, the first economy has actually seen positive charts, instead of negative. In a different quarterly analysis in 2019 (quarter 4), the Stats SA reported that South Africa's non-agricultural sector added 16,000 jobs, which increased the number of persons employed in the formal non-agricultural sector up to 10.2 million. In this same quarter 4 of 2019 analysis, the trend continued to be positive for the trade industries, as it added 29,000 additional jobs. The business service industry reported 12,000 additional jobs as well.

Difference in racial groups 
The black population stands at 80.6% of the population, the mixed race category makes up 8.8%, the whites make up 8.1% and Asians including Indians make up 2.5%. Data made available by CNN presented that white South Africans earn nearly three times the average wage made by black South Africans, who take up the overwhelming majority of the workforce population. Data shows that the widening and intergenerational gap is disproportionately affecting the black South Africans. The World Bank estimates that South Africa would need to double the amount of jobs created every year, in order to see a significant reduction. The service sector dominates the homogenous workforce, and the low skilled manufacturing or agricultural jobs are declining. South Africa is on track to produce a more polarized country in multiple categories, leaving the lower income classes with less opportunity to grow and a lack of exposure to education or other ingredients for growth across generations.

The chart below, conducted by Stats SA, measures the labor market trends between the black and white population groups in South Africa:

Black African:

White:

Bibliography 

inequality